Beaver Creek Township may refer to:

Beaver Creek Township, Hamilton County, Illinois
Beaver Creek Township, Michigan
Beaver Creek Township, Minnesota
Beaver Creek Township, Wilkes County, North Carolina, in Wilkes County, North Carolina
Beaver Creek Township, Steele County, North Dakota, in Steele County, North Dakota
Beaver Creek Township, Tripp County, South Dakota, in Tripp County, South Dakota

See also
 Beavercreek Township, Greene County, Ohio
 Beaver Creek (disambiguation)

Township name disambiguation pages